Catarina Sousa (born 27 April 2000) is an Angolan swimmer. She competed in the women's 50 metre backstroke event at the 2017 World Aquatics Championships. In 2019, she represented Angola at the 2019 African Games held in Rabat, Morocco.

She competed in the women's 100m freestyle event at the 2020 Summer Olympics. She swam a time of 59.35 in her heat and finished in 47th place overall.

References

External links
 

2000 births
Living people
Angolan female swimmers
Place of birth missing (living people)
Swimmers at the 2019 African Games
Female backstroke swimmers
African Games competitors for Angola
Swimmers at the 2020 Summer Olympics
Olympic swimmers of Angola
S.L. Benfica (swimming)